Sea of Tranquility (Mare Tranquilitatis) is a large, dark, basaltic plain on Earth's Moon.

Sea of Tranquility may also refer to:

Literature
 Sea of Tranquility, a 2003 novel by Lesley Choyce
 Sea of Tranquility (novel), a 2022 novel by Emily St. John Mandel

Music
 Sea of Tranquility, a 1984 album by Phil Coulter
 The Sea of Tranquility, a 2010 album by Neograss
 "Sea of Tranquility", a song from Billy Cobham's 1974 album Total Eclipse
 "Sea of Tranquility", a song from Barclay James Harvest's 1977 album Gone to Earth
 "Sea of Tranquility", a song from Gordon Lightfoot's 1980 album Dream Street Rose
 "Sea of Tranquility", a song from Undercover's 1982 self-titled debut album
 "Sea of Tranquility", a song from Book of Love's 1988 album Lullaby
 "Sea of Tranquility", a song from Galactic Cowboys' 1991 self-titled debut album
 "Sea of Tranquility", a song from Siouxsie Sioux's 2007 album Mantaray
 "The Sea of Tranquility", a song by Neograss from the 2010 eponymous album The Sea of Tranquility

See also

 Tranquility (disambiguation)
 Sea (disambiguation)